Plaza de Mayo is a station on Line A of the Buenos Aires Underground. This station belonged to the first section of line opened on 1 December 1913, linking the station with the station of Plaza Miserere.

Overview
It lies at the intersection of Hipólito Yrigoyen and Defensa, in the neighborhood of Montserrat. It's a busy station because it is the head of the line A and is in the historic centre of Buenos Aires. Nearby are some of the most important public buildings in the country such as the Casa Rosada, the Ministry of Economy, the Metropolitan Cathedral and the Buenos Aires City Hall. There is also the Plaza de Mayo, tourist and protest centre where the Pirámide de Mayo is located. A few hundred metres is located the Puerto Madero district, another of the city's tourist zones.

The station was named in honor of Plaza de Mayo, the most important square of the city. The Plaza was in colonial times the main square (Plaza Mayor) around which the city was formed, always being the center of popular demand.

In 1997 the station was declared a national historic monument.

Gallery

Nearby
 Plaza de Mayo
 Casa Rosada
 Buenos Aires Metropolitan Cathedral
 Buenos Aires Cabildo
 Florida Street
 Puerto Madero

References

External links

Buenos Aires Underground stations
Railway stations opened in 1913
1913 establishments in Argentina
National Historic Monuments of Argentina